Ted Nugent: Extended Versions is a compilation album of by the American hard rock guitarist Ted Nugent, featuring songs extracted from his live albums.

Track listing
All songs written by Ted Nugent except where noted.
 "Stormtroopin'" - 5:52
 "Just What the Doctor Ordered" - 5:17
 "Dog Eat Dog" - 5:18
 "Yank Me, Crank Me" - 4:21
 "Stranglehold" - 10:27
 "Cat Scratch Fever" - 3:49
 "Put Up or Shut Up" - 3:23
 "Land of a Thousand Dances" (Fats Domino, Chris Kenner) - 4:31
 "I Take No Prisoners" - 3:28
 "Baby Please Don't Go" (Big Joe Williams) - 5:50

 Tracks 1, 2, 4, 5, & 10 taken from Double Live Gonzo!
 Tracks 7, 8, & 9 taken from Intensities in 10 Cities
 Track 3 taken from Free-for-All reissue; Recorded live at Hammersmith Odeon, London, 1977
 Tracks 1, 2, 3, 4, 5 & 10 with Rob Grange

References

2005 compilation albums
Ted Nugent albums